Comin' On with the Chet Baker Quintet is an album by trumpeter Chet Baker which was recorded in 1965 and released on the Prestige label.

Reception

Allmusic rated the album as 3 stars.

Track listing 
All compositions by Richard Carpenter except where noted.
 "Comin' On" – 5:40
 "Stairway to the Stars" (Matty Malneck, Mitchell Parish, Frank Signorelli) – 4:44
 "No Fair Lady" (Jimmy Mundy) – 8:15
 "When You're Gone" (J. J. Johnson) – 4:08
 "Choose Now" (Tadd Dameron) – 5:51
 "Chabootie" – 6:57
 "Carpsie's Groove" (Richard Carpenter, Sonny Stitt) – 6:34

Personnel 
Chet Baker – flugelhorn
George Coleman – tenor saxophone
Kirk Lightsey – piano
Herman Wright – bass
Roy Brooks – drums

References 

Chet Baker albums
1967 albums
Prestige Records albums